The Indian cricket team toured England in the 1990 season and played 14 first-class matches including three Tests.  They also played in two limited overs internationals. England won the Test series 1-0 with two matches drawn. The Indian team was captained by Mohammed Azharuddin and was a mix of both youth and experience, having experienced veterans such as Dilip Vengsarkar, Ravi Shastri and Kapil Dev as well as upcoming stars like Sanjay Manjrekar and Sachin Tendulkar. The series is notable for Graham Gooch's triple century, legendary leg-spinner and future Indian cricket captain Anil Kumble making his international debut and Tendulkar making his 1st Test century at the age of 17, becoming the youngest Test centurion at the time.

Background
India were the second touring side to visit England in 1990, following New Zealand, who had lost their three-match Test series 1–0 and drawn the One Day series 1–1 during their tour. England's victory against New Zealand was their first series win at home since the 1985 Ashes and, except for a victory in a one-off match against Sri Lanka, their first home Test victory in 24 attempts. India's previous tour of England was in 1986, when they won 2–0; coming into the 1990 tour, they had not won an away Test match since. The two sides had not met since the 1986 tour.

The Indian team selected for the tour was different compared to the successful 1986 team. Legendary players like Sunil Gavaskar and Mohinder Amarnath had long since retired, while opener Krishnamachari Srikkanth and left-arm spinner Maninder Singh were dropped. However the team now had a young Sachin Tendulkar, who had already proved himself at the age of 17 as capable of being world-class and was now being predicted as the successor to Gavaskar. Captain Mohammed Azharuddin was now the leading batsman in the side while the 1986 tour winning captain Kapil Dev, Ravi Shastri and the hero of the 1986 tour, Dilip Vengsarkar, were slowly coming to the end of their careers.

Test series

First Test

Second Test

Third Test

One Day series

First ODI

Second ODI

Aftermath
Both Azharuddin and Atherton were named Wisden Cricketers of the Year.

External sources
CricketArchive – tour itineraries

Annual reviews
 Playfair Cricket Annual 1991
 Wisden Cricketers' Almanack 1991

References

Further reading
 Ramachandra Guha, A Corner of a Foreign Field - An Indian History of a British Sport, Picador, 2001

1990 in English cricket
1990
International cricket competitions from 1988–89 to 1991
1990 in cricket
1990 in Indian cricket